John William Frederick Arthur Crawfurd (15 November 1878 – 22 June 1939) was an Irish cricketer. He was a left-handed batsman and a left-arm fast-medium bowler.

Crawfurd attended Merchant Taylors' School, Northwood, before going up to St John's College, Oxford. He started his first-class cricket career with Oxford University, for whom he played 14 first-class matches in 1900 and 1901. He later played two first-class matches against the university, one for Harlequins and another for an "L Robinson's XI" that featured his fellow Irish international Tim O'Brien. He also represented the university at Rugby Union.

He played four times for Ireland between 1907 and 1923, making his debut against Yorkshire. Three of his matches for Ireland had first-class status.

At his death in 1939, the notice in The Times cites him as being "of Guinness's Brewery, Dublin".

References

1878 births
1939 deaths
Irish cricketers
Oxford University cricketers
Oxford University RFC players
Irish rugby union players
Harlequins cricketers
People educated at Merchant Taylors' School, Northwood
Alumni of St John's College, Oxford
L. G. Robinson's XI cricketers